Anne Horak Gallagher (born May 5, 1984) is an American stage, television and film actor, known best for performing in Broadway theatre productions of Chicago—as Roxie Hart and in Irving Berlin's White Christmas—as Rita.

Early life
Anne Horak Gallagher was born in De Pere, Wisconsin to Richard Horak, an orthopedic surgeon, and his wife Ellen. She attended high school at Notre Dame Academy in Green Bay taking lead roles in school musicals such as Crazy for You. She went on to complete a Bachelor of Fine Arts at University of Michigan.

Career
Having performed in the Toronto production of Irving Berlin's White Christmas, Horak made her Broadway debut as Rita in the 2008 production of the musical directed by Tony Award winner Walter Bobbie. She went on to tour the country as Inga in Mel Brooks' Young Frankenstein directed by Susan Stroman. In 2013 she performed in the Broadway production of Chicago as Mona, later taking over the role of Roxie Hart, both on Broadway and the subsequent national and international tours.

In 2017 she played Patsy in MCP's 25th Anniversary Concert of Crazy for You at Lincoln Center's David Geffen Hall. Later that year, also at Lincoln Center, she played Clo-Clo in the Metropolitan Opera's production of The Merry Widow.  Both were directed by Susan Stroman. In 2018 she performed in a concert version of On the Town with Boston Pops directed by Kathleen Marshall. She has performed in musicals across the United States, some of which include the roles of Gretchen in Boeing-Boeing at Paper Mill Playhouse Sheila in A Chorus Line at Lexington Opera House and Charity in Sweet Charity at the Marriott Theatre where Chicago Tribune reviewed her performance as “beautifully acted—assertive, vulnerable and richly connected—and courageously danced.”

Horak has performed in roles on film, such as Martin Scorsese's The Irishman and in TV series, such as Forever, Submissions Only, Royal Pains, A Gifted Man and Law & Order: Special Victims Unit. She has also appeared, as herself, in a 2014 episode of Keeping Up with the Kardashians.

Personal life 
In September 2019 Anne Horak married U.S. Representative Mike Gallagher, taking the name Anne Horak Gallagher. They have one child, a daughter, born in June 2020.

Credits

Stage

Film and television

References

External links

1984 births
21st-century American actresses
Actresses from Wisconsin
American musical theatre actresses
Living people
People from De Pere, Wisconsin
University of Michigan School of Music, Theatre & Dance alumni